Pinoy Big Brother has received criticism from the Filipino public and news media. Organizations including Endemol and the Movie and Television Review and Classification Board have investigated the show.

Season 1

When the show was met with criticism for outfits worn by female contestants and "objectionable dialogue," Melissa Laguardia, Chair of the Movie and Television Review and Classification Board (MTRCB), met with ABS-CBN executives discuss how “to make [the show] more wholesome.” ABS-CBN promised to make an "improved" show more suitable for younger audiences in the future. As a result, each episode begins with a warning reminding viewers that some scenes in the show that are not suitable for younger audiences. Some broadcast scenes were still determined to be beyond the parental guidance rating given by the Board, which caused MTRCB to suspend the program for one episode. The program was not aired on September 25, 2005, the day after the 2nd eviction night.

See: MTRCB's suspension order: 

Franzen Fajardo created controversy when he violated Big Brother's rules, including mouthing words to fellow housemate Cassandra Ponti. Show producers and consultants from Endemol deliberated over the mouthing of words, resulting in a decision to evict Fajardo on Day 86. However, Ponti offered to voluntarily exit to keep Fajardo inside; Big Brother considered her offer and let the public choose Fajardo's fate. The next day, voting stopped and Fajardo's eviction was finalized after he violated the rules again by discussing his last chat with Big Brother inside the confession room with fellow housemate Jason Gainza. He eventually left the house on Day 91.

Around September 2005, rumors circulated through email claiming that Uma Khouny, Cassandra Ponti, and Sam Milby were hired by the show without auditioning. Khouny stated in one episode that he made the cut for the show through the assistance of network official Linggit Tan. In response, the show aired footage showing that the three indeed auditioned. The existence of the "Youth Alliance of the Philippines," which created the email, was never determined.

Khouny and Milby were fined by the Department of Labor and Employment for participating in the show without a valid working permit. Fines of PHP 10,000 and PHP 40,000 were respectively meted on Khouny, a Filipino-Israeli, and Milby, a Filipino-American.

Pinoy Ako, the theme song for season 1, was accused of being plagiarized from the song Chandeliers by 80s British band Care. Jonathan Manalo, a member of Orange and Lemons and the song's composer, asserted that any similarity was unintentional.

Celebrity Edition 1

The show was supposed to be launched on February 4, 2006, but the management postponed it to the following day, February 5 because of the fallout following the Wowowee ULTRA stampede. The incident resulted in host Willie Revillame resigning from the show; Luis Manzano taking over his spot.

On Day 12, Angela Calina voluntarily exited the house as soon as she received news that her apartment unit in Cebu had been burglarized. She left the game to attend to her daughter, whom she knew was in danger when the incident happened. As a result, voting for the nominees for that week was suspended.

On February 21, 2006, Gretchen Malalad left the house after Big Brother allowed her to report to her superiors in the Philippine Air Force, where she holds the rank of airwoman second-class, to face a summary investigation about her being AWOL. He did this in the proviso that she cannot talk to anyone except those who were investigating her and she must return to the house 24 hours after she left. She returned 14 hours later after the Air Force command officially authorized her to continue her stint in the show.

For the first time in Philippine television history, housemate Rustom Padilla came out to fellow housemate Keanna Reeves. This event was featured in Big Brother UK's Big Brother Around the World, a special show highlighting notable events from other foreign editions of the franchise. It was aired before Big Brother: Celebrity Hijack.

Teen Edition 1

Since the show started, Aldred Gatchalian had a difficult time adjusting to his new environment and new housemates and he never resolved his problems, resolving to make his voluntary exit on Day 7. Two days later, new housemate Joaqui Mendoza took his place. It was widely speculated before he left that Aldred was underaged, hence his voluntary exit. However, in his first interview a week after his exit, he stated that he left because of homesickness and the pressure to fit in.

Season 2

Film director Jose Javier Reyes, who previously sat in as one of the jurors in Pinoy Dream Academy, lambasted the program, stating the show wanted to bring "everyone who had a face and a body." Reyes added that the program was a boot camp for Philippines' Next Top Model, exhibited disturbing behavior from certain housemates, and describing the challenges as "meaningless." He concluded that the whole ordeal was an audition for a new Star Cinema film or for an episode of the Maalaala Mo Kaya drama series. In reaction, the show's director, Laurenti Dyogi, defended the program by giving clarifications on certain issues presented by Reyes, especially the fact that housemates actually learn something, citing Nel Rapiz' atonement of not urinating in a public place again. But Dyogi admitted that there is no way to please all of them, especially on their sensibilities. In fact, Dyogi divulged that Reyes already told ABS-CBN about his article even before it was published.

In a March 22, 2007 memorandum, MTRCB took the network to task for airing the "naughty actions" of Dionne Monsanto. Board chairman Consoliza Laguardia said Dionne "inserted her hands in the underwear" of Ezekiel Dimaguila in the March 20, 2007, episode, with the show management invited to a meeting on March 27, 2007, at the board's office in Quezon City. As a result of the hearing, director Laurenti Dyogi, stated in his letter to the Board the same day that the network would issue an apology to viewers who may have been offended by Dionne's behavior and will continue to keep tabs on her. Show host Toni Gonzaga apologized on behalf of the management on the episode aired a few hours after the meeting. Big Brother also ordered Dionne to stay away from Dimaguila from March 28 to March 31.

On Day 63, Bea Saw and Maricris Dizon were caught up in a heated argument after the latter suspected the former's feelings for fellow housemate Nel Rapiz. Bea denied any accusations. Maricris, not content with her answers, started to make threatening remarks against Bea. The two did not end their conversation well and the following day, Dizon was ejected from the House after making threatening remarks to the housemates.

Pinoy Big Brother and Big Brother Slovenia agreed on a swap where their respective housemates, Bruce Quebral and Tina Semolič, were to participate. While Tina left the Philippines without much incident, Bruce was the topic of discrimination by Slovenian housemates Miha and Pero. Their inappropriate remarks did not sit well with their fellow housemates and the audience. Pero was forcibly evicted over his actions, including holding a knife in a threatening manner, and Miha was automatically nominated for the fifth eviction round, along with nominees Jasmin and Sonja.

Days' after Nel Rapiz's eviction from the House on June 23, 2007, an e-mail coming from an "MA Masscom graduate" who claimed to work for the show as a "conceptualizer" surfaced. The author, who was said to be involved in the voting procedure, divulged that on the night in question, Wendy Valdez was in fact the lowest vote-earner, but she was not evicted because "administrators" wanted her relationship with Bruce Quebral "to give it one last shot." The author also allegedly helped in handling the auditions by determining the fates of each housemates with assistance from "talent auditors." The show production team denounced the claims, stating that no conceptualizers and talent auditors exist in the show since the show's concept is already created in the Netherlands, where the franchise originated. Furthermore, no conceptualizer was involved in the screening process, which selected the Top 30 candidates to be screened for the show, not the Top 100 as the e-mail claimed. The staff stated that the entire tabulation of votes was done electronically and it is closely monitored by a third-party accounting firm since the start of the open voting, the results of which are totally unpredictable. In fact, they stated that Nel and Bruce were really the lowest vote earners and the trend did not change when Bruce was evicted three days after Nel. Furthermore, the e-mail referred to show director Laurenti Dyogi as "Direk Dyogi," not "Direk Lauren" or "LMD," as those who are involved in the show call him.

While these rumors and criticisms persisted, Wendy eventually reached the final four which further sparked speculations of conspiracy and put final voting results questionable. Consequently, she ended up in third place instead.

Celebrity Edition 2

There had been early reports that Ethel Booba wanted to back out days before the launch. She said that she might not be psychologically fit for the show. On Day 4, after much persuasion, she went in. However, she would complain about the nature of the show. until she left the house along with Mcoy Fundales on Day 40. However, on Day 56, she expresses her willingness to return. Her plea was granted on Day 59 but only as a houseguest. She exited the House on Day 77.

The housemates were assigned to create a 15-minute video as part of their sixth weekly task. Unfortunately, Big Brother accused Mcoy Fundales of plagiarism because of the script he made that was similar to The Ghost of August Mayford by Troy Taylor. Fundales stated that the script was original. After much pressure about the issue, he left the house on Day 40 together with Ethel Booba. During the Über broadcast the next day, Big Brother apologized for any misunderstanding from the incident. Laurenti Dyogi, the show's director, stated that Big Brother's intention was to clarify to Fundales if he will be willing to be held liable for any copyright complaint after the film had been shown on television.

On Day 66, Yayo Aguila left the Big Brother House because of news that her mother was hospitalized due to a heart ailment. Yayo went to the hospital only to find that her mother had died. After the funeral of her mother on Day 70, Aguila expressed her intention of coming back as a competing housemate. With only two weeks left in its extended run, Endemol gave four conditions, one being that one of the remaining housemates give up their stint. Gaby de la Merced wanted to volunteer but the fourth condition said that an overnight poll would take place on who should stay between de la Merced and Aguila. The housemate leaving would receive PHP400,000, extracted from the final four's cash prizes as a supposed donation to Aguila's family. Aguila was reunited with the housemates but it was only short-lived as she was placed in the public vote against de la Merced. She was evicted on Day 71.

On Day 60, Baron Geisler got drunk and started flirting with the female housemates and making insulting remarks to Big Brother. The male housemates were ordered to put Baron in a secret room for him to sober up. He promised that it will not happen again but he went out of control again on Day 73, in the wee hours of Christmas. Geisler was forcibly evicted on Day 75.

As part of the tests given to the housemates on the final week, on Day 77, they were asked who among them does not deserve to make it to the finals as part of the mock nomination round, to which the housemates didn't answer. After much hinting from Big Brother, the housemates nominated each other, with Jon Avila nominating Gaby dela Merced and Riza Santos. The following day, Avila admitted to making a remark saying, "Is everyone thinking what I'm thinking? Five medallions are here. And we're five here", which influenced his fellow housemates' choices. After further consideration with Endemol, Avila was forcibly evicted on Day 81.

Teen Edition Plus

There had been speculations that the voting was manipulated during the finals. The management and Endemol made a joint statement on June 13, 2008, that the voting was fair and no manipulation took place.

Double Up

In a confession room session on October 7, 2009, JP Lagumbay learned that his employer did not approve his leave, which he filed to appear on the show. He was ordered to report back to work by 8 AM the following day or he could face sanctions. JP eventually left the House in the wee hours.

During a live show on Day 7, Cathy was introduced as a new housemate wearing a nurse's uniform as a costume for the Halloween-themed show. The Philippine Nurses Association sent a protest against Remperas, saying that her act destroyed the image of a nurse. The show apologized for any misunderstanding and explained that the housemates should wear a costume as part of the live show.

After the House Battle on the sixth week, Tom Mott punched the Activity Hall's wall. Although he claimed that it was a result of frustration as a result of losing the House Battle and falling ill hours before, the other housemates deemed it as threatening behavior. Tom was allowed to go to the hospital to consult with a doctor. However, despite getting back inside before the 24-hour window lapsed, Mott was forcibly evicted over the destruction of Big Brother's property and left on Day 42.

Rica Paras, the franchise's first transgender housemate, was the subject of bullying by housemates Hermes Bautista, Yuri Okawa, Rocky Salumbides, Mariel Sorino, Rob Stumvoll and Patrick Villanueva, with Salumbides made adding derogatory remarks, such as Paras being a "she-man." The Society of Transsexual Women of the Philippines (STRAP), where Paras is vice-chairman, released an official statement about the events on their official website. Big Brother ordered the housemates involved to apologize for their behavior. Despite what happened, the show received a Sybil Award from STRAP on May 22, 2010, because of its openness towards transgender people.

As part of the Three Kings task, Tibo Jumalon wore a bahag, a garment worn by Philippine indigenous groups, particularly Aetas, Mangyans, and Dumagats, to teach the value of frugality of clothing. This called the attention of the Katribu, a party representing indigenous peoples in Congress, because of Jumalon's inappropriate way of wearing the bahag. Partylist president Beverly Longid said: While we understand that the intent of its use is to promote certain moral values, we believe it diminished the cultural symbolism and importance of the indigenous garb ... Any inappropriate use of our culture not only offends our sensitivities but also demeans the integrity of our customs and traditions, which we passionately defend together with our rights to ancestral land and self-determination.She called the show producers to teach the proper way of wearing the garment. The show production staff later responded and said:
 We apologize if our housemate was unable to strictly follow the guidelines but rest assured that, at this moment, measures are underway to correct that matter ... it did not intend to offend the sensitivities and customs of the indigenous people in any way.

Accusations of vote-rigging were brought against the show when Melai Cantiveros emerged as the Big Winner, in which some viewers contended that the reveal of the partial results for the final four housemates prior to the Big Night was done to favor Cantiveros who was trailing behind Paul Jake Castillo. Both Castillo and the Pinoy Big Brother management denied the accusations.

Teen Clash 2010

On April 27, 2010, Eslove Briones was meted a forced eviction after he played with a knife and pointing it at Tricia Santos, though done jokingly, per a rule allowing such punishment immediately if the housemate committed violent acts or has the tendency to do so. He later threatened her about doing the stabbing act again, especially when Tricia complained to Big Brother through the house cameras about his actions. In one episode, Big Brother showed the video footage of the incident to fellow housemate, Joe, who reacted that Eslove's actions were not a joke, but rather a serious matter.

Housemates Ivan Dorschner and Ann Li shared an intimate kiss in a game of Spin the Bottle on May 26, 2010. Live feed subscribers witnessed the incident and clips of this scene circulated around Facebook and YouTube. Big Brother called all housemates to the confession room about the matter. The scene was not broadcast on television as it would attract the MTRCB, who are strict in terms of certain acts concerning teens. Reports further stated that not only Dorschner and Li did the act but so did other housemates.

Unlimited

During Team High-Voltage's eighth weekly task, in which they would have to produce a news program for the whole week, Wendy Tabusalla reported that a certain housemate, later identified as Joseph Biggel, was lying about his "first-time" experiences, such as eating ice cream and swimming in a pool. His "first-time" frenzies created a buzz on social media sites and forums prior to Tabusalla's reporting; various photos and videos that debunked Biggel's claims surfaced. Many people believed that he did it to get sympathy from the viewers. Big Brother ordered Biggel to explain the photos and videos. Show psychologist Randy Dellosa said Biggel experienced selective amnesia, in which a person forgets one particular moment in their life. Biggel was found to have fudged over details of his family past, which later resulted in his father hanging up on him three days before the finale.

Despite the controversy, Biggel was given a segment in the fourth teen edition's Über afternoon show, paying homage to his "first-time" antics when he was still in the House.

Teen Edition 4

There have been reports saying that housemate Kit Thompson is said to be older than his presented age, which is 15, even surpassing the show's age limit, which is only 13 to 17 years old.

During the week-long interlude between the Unlimited finale and Teen Edition 4'''s opening night, senior members of the production staff stated via Twitter about the confidentiality of potential housemates being very important in the show, implying that at least one shortlisted housemate has been sent home just as all other confirmed housemates were already isolated ahead of the launch. This was a result of pictures of possible housemates making rounds online just after a teaser video was shown in the Unlimited finale. Some of the "rumored" housemates were later confirmed on opening night and the introduction show for a second batch of housemates on Day 2. Though lists and pictures of rumored housemates - some of which are confirmed - have been spreading since the franchise's launch, it is the first time the staff announced a disqualification among possible housemates to be made public.

A video was made days before opening night wherein Ryan Boyce explained his rationale for joining the show. He also mentioned certain legs of the audition process, which is a violation of show rules against discussing such matters outside of production. Although it was supposedly made by Boyce's friends for private viewing by family members, the video appeared for a short time on the video-sharing site Vimeo after he entered the house.

Only a few weeks into the show, several housemates were a subject of several romantic issues: Mariz being given a marriage proposal prior to entering in the House, Alec kissing Jai "accidentally", Yves forgetting his girlfriend outside the House and chooses to be with Myrtle and formation of various love teams and triangles. Several Filipino celebrities, including Vice Ganda and host John Prats, expressed their shock with how quick today's teenagers fall in love, with Vice Ganda coining the meme "PBB Teens?".

All In

The Philippine Commission on Women called the attention of MTRCB to review an episode aired June 4, 2014, where Jayme Jalandoni was asked if she wanted to pose nude for a painting, as part of their sixth weekly task. Jalandoni was hesitant about the challenge at first but she accepted after being given some time to think about it. According to the PCW, there is nothing wrong with women posing nude, so long as it is her free choice to do so. They added that the show violated her freedom of thought, conscience, and belief, stating that "Big Brother's exercise of authority over her is evidently suggestive; placing the female contestant under pressure amid the latter's rejection of the challenge." They cited Section 19 of the Implementing Rules and Regulations of the Magna Carta of Women as stating that media organizations should not induce, encourage, and/or condone violence against women in any form and/or in the violation of their human rights. Pia Cayetano, principal author of the Magna Carta of Women, commented the event as tantamount to coercion. Menerva Espanta spokesperson for the Kabataang Artista para sa Tunay na Kalayaan (Young Artists for True Freedom) talent advocacy group, also commented on an episode where three of the housemates' mothers were tasked to clean the rooms of housemates, branding the show as anti-women, stating "The show reinforces how society treats women and their role in society. That they are simply meant for housework and/or sexual entertainment disguised as art. Art should be reflective of society and challenge it. PBB has used art as a justification for treating a woman like a commodity in a show which targets a young audience."

737
On its first week, photos of Bailey May and Kenzo Gutierrez being affectionate to each other, as well as other male housemates, went viral on social media. Screencaps of the following events that were edited with sexual undertone also went viral. Many expressed concern about the potential malice these actions bring to the viewers. On June 27, 2015, resident psychologist Randy Dellosa explained that their actions could be caused by their family backgrounds and the fact that they have an openly gay housemate, Ryan Bacalla; their actions are to make Ryan feel comfortable around the male housemates. Dellosa assured the housemates' parents and the viewers that there is nothing wrong with brotherly affection, and explained changing views on gender and sexuality in modern times, as well as the perception of Filipinos about this kind of affection. Despite this, MTRCB has called the management for a meeting about the issue as it was getting "numerous feedback and complaints." The board wanted to make sure that the show will "guarantee that no participants... [are] exposed to situation, challenges and experiences which may be prejudicial to his or her well-being, or which may have a negative impact on the youth and other audiences who will be watching the show." As a preventive response, ABS-CBN cut off its free live stream online and on cable TV on July 3, 2015. According to them, this is to protect the housemates against netizens who paint the housemates in a negative light. In response, fans started a petition to bring back the livestream. With the entrance of the regular housemates on Day 50, viewers were given limited streaming for two hours from Monday to Friday, during Pinoy Big Brother: 737 Online. Eventually, 24-hour live streaming returned on SkyCable on August 17, 2015.

Upon his entrance on Day 51, Philip Lampart was permitted to bring his one-year-old son, Romeo, inside the House for a week. The show wanted to highlight the importance of a parent's presence in the development of the child. This move was met with mixed reactions, with some finding it good for the show, and others as an exploitative move. MTRCB has yet to release a formal statement regarding the matter once they receive a formal complaint.

Lucky 7
On an episode that aired on August 12, 2016, housemates were seen laughing at an undergarment owned by housemate Rita Gaviola, a member of the Badjao ethnic group. The housemates apologized for their actions after. Albay Representative Joey Salceda called the Department of Social Welfare and Development, MTRCB, and the National Commission on Indigenous Peoples to step in on the incident, saying that some discrimination happened against the Badjaos. Salceda added:
From the start, PBB should have been structured to prevent its occurrence. Treatment of indigenous peoples is too delicate for a 'role playing-cum-confession room' context. It may address the direct participants but what about millions who watch the violation but failed for some reason to watch the episode of correction.
MTRCB called for a meeting about the incident, citing factors like Rita's age and her role as a representative of an indigenous group as valid reasons for the conference.

Otso
On November 25, 2018, Pinoy Big Brother streamed a special online show called YouthTube, hosted by Bianca Gonzales and Robi Domingo, in which they discuss, with experts, ex-housemates, and viewers, issues surrounding housemates Art Guma, regarding his sexuality, and his alleged coming out in the House, Lie Reposposa; regarding how netizens see her as overreacting, Criza Ta-a, regarding fake social media posts about conversations she allegedly had with other housemates; Karina Bautista, being bashed and criticized by netizens for falling in love with Aljon Mendoza despite having a boyfriend in the outside world; and Ali Abinal, Reign Parani, and Rhys Eugenio being bashed by netizens and calling them traitors for picking their friends in Camp Star Hunt instead of their fellow housemates in the Decem-versus challenge. Experts from the show agreed that netizens should be more responsible and careful when sharing on social media, and to be especially critical of the content that they see online.

In a livestream dated November 29, 2018, contestant Sansan Dagumampan has uttered to fellow contestants that bisexuals are "disgusting." Missy Quino, who was present in the conversation, has called out Dagumampan on her remarks, saying that if bisexuals are happy with their preferences, then they should let them be, but Dagumampan has insisted on her earlier remarks. Krist Vertudez and Reign Parani looked uncomfortable with the conversation and changed it to discussing their upcoming tasks. Netizens criticized Dagumampan, and have asked ABS-CBN to remove her from the show. Other parties have yet to release a statement regarding this conversation.

Angela Tungol from Batch 3 also received heavy backlash from netizens for bashing Batch 1 housemates Karina Bautista and Criza Ta-a during their stay in Twitter.

A 27-year-old housemate from Quezon City, Banjo Dangalan, was forcibly evicted from the house on June 4, 2019, after making a rape joke. The rape joke comments were being compared to President Rodrigo Duterte (who was also drawn heavy criticism for making rape jokes during the 2016 presidential election campaign) by some netizens.See the citations:

 Connect 
On December 16, 2020, Justin Dizon became a trending topic online due to his rude behaviors, including bullying, towards Jie-Ann Armero. Snippets of a livestream video showed that Dizon used Armero's bath towel to wipe his hands. Armero said that she did not care about Dizon's behavior; Dizon responded with "Really? Sabagay, marumi ka nga pala (Really? Well, after all, you're dirty)." His response earned the ire of the netizens, some even called for his eviction. He also trended before after he jokingly made fun of Armero for her poor hygiene. Dizon later apologized to Armero for his actions towards; while Armero explained to Big Brother on why she does not take a bath frequently was because her family has to ration their water due to the limited supply in her province. On December 22, 2020, he was among the three housemates nominated. At the end of the week, he was voted out by the public and has even received a negative percentage of votes.

In an episode aired January 2, 2021, a conversation about ABS-CBN's shutdown was opened between the housemates. Crismar Menchavez and Russu Laurente confessed to the other housemates that they agreed to it and they were sorry for it. Meanwhile, it was already known outside the house that Laurente was vocal with the network's shutdown which caused various reactions among netizens. After they were called by Big Brother, the two confessed and admitted with their agreement to the network's shutdown: Menchavez said that it had occurred in his thoughts and agreed to the network's shutdown albeit not being vocal about it; Laurente, on the other hand, admitted that he was for the network's shutdown and was very vocal about it. The two were later were forgiven by Big Brother and were told that they should always remember that they are part of ABS-CBN's family now. With the issue, a lot of reactions erupted online; some even called for their immediate eviction (knowing that each of the two were one of the three nominees of the week).

Laurente was evicted on January 3, 2021. During the eviction night, Laurente's brother asked for forgiveness to ABS-CBN for his actions towards the network. He also asked sorry for Robi Domingo (who was outside the House, together with Toni Gonzaga, hosting the show) who was emotional with the issue being brought-up again during the airing of an episode of the show's companion program in Kumu. In that online show, he stated that he vocal against those people inside the House who favored for the network's shutdown; he also echoed the words of Laurente who had once had an issue with another housemate: "We can forgive, but we will not forget." Further, he continued and said that, "this is the voice of those who lost. When they all come out of the brother's house, I will show them this (ABS-CBN logo), think of it, it's not just a symbol, this is our mantra, this is our life."

At the sixth nomination night aired on January 28, 2021, there has been a lot of online discussions on Big Brother's decision in adding the Power of Veto, a power that allows a Head of Household to remove one housemate from the list of nominees of the nomination. For that week, the set of nominees were Aizyl Tandugon, Ella Cayabyab, Andrea Abaya, and Jie-ann Armero but the latter two were saved by the Head of Households, leaving Tandugon and Cayabyab as the only nominees left for that week. Viewers took it to Twitter to express their opinions and thoughts regarding this rule that the show had added and found it very fishy or sketchy. Many disagreed with the sudden twist; it earned a lot of criticism, pointing out how it is unfair. A lot of people online called out the franchise for having favoritism on certain housemates and for not following the original American rule for the Power of Veto. The #BoycottPBB trended number one in the Philippines on Twitter, with more than 30 thousand tweets posted.

 Kumunity Season 10 
The second nomination week of the celebrity edition saw a tight battle between the set of nominees. Two days prior to the end of voting, the management decided to remove the Kumu voting limit of 10 votes per account per day in a twist called "Unli-Voting." The twist drew some flak amongst avid and loyal viewers, claiming that "it is unfair" as the results wouldn't reflect the choices of the voting audience as a small amount of voters can drastically swing the results for or against a nominee in limited time. It was also seen as a sketchy move intended to save alleged management favorite Anji Salvacion, who was trailing Albie Casiño before unli-voting came into effect, and Salvacion was criticized by viewers for giving a harsh rebuke to fellow nominee KD Estrada, who was struggling with his mental health at the time, causing her to garner a lot of BBEs (votes to evict) prior to the unli-voting announcement.

By the time the voting closed, Salvacion overtook Casiño, who ended up being the second evictee. As a result, the hashtags #PBBUnfair and #PBBCancelUnliVotes trended on Twitter with the fans sending questions on executive producer and director Lauren Dyogi's Twitter, who then explained that they "initially planned it for the first nomination week but it didn't push through because of technical issues." After weeks of further criticism, especially after Estrada and fellow fan favorite Alexa Ilacad were both evicted on the same night, the twist was later cancelled for the Celebrity Batch's final eviction and, by extension the latter part of the season.

Brenda Mage received backlash from viewers after a clip of him giving inappropriate remarks went viral across social media platforms, which included inappropriate solicitation of sexual favors towards Eian Rances and offensive jokes. Mage apologized to Rances after being reminded by Big Brother in the confession room. Mage also received backlash for allegedly talking bad behind fellow housemate Alexa Ilacad due to both of their relationships with Rances, and the viewers were upset when a Kumu livestream Clip showcased Mage talking harshly about Ilacad to his fellow housemate, Madam Inutz. Mage "presumably" apologized to Ilacad after their exit on Big Brother.

TJ Valderrama was subjected to controversy after he was spotted touching and looking at Shanaia Gomez in an allegedly sexual manner on several occasions by live feed viewers. This resulted in calls for his immediate removal from the house with the hashtag #ForceEvictTJ trending nationwide on November 20, 2021, alongside "Protect Shanaia Gomez." Gabriela Women's Party, a left-wing Filipino political party which advocates for the protection of women's rights, has also released a statement calling out the show regarding the issue. Moreover, the show and the housemates stated that there was nothing wrong happening, and that the viewers should be careful of what they accuse. Valderrama was eventually evicted on Day 51 while also receiving a negative vote tally.

Michael Ver Comaling received heavy backlash from viewers for allegedly talking about the Juane siblings, Nathan and Raf, behind their backs in a bad manner to fellow housemate Laziz Rustamov, who is a close friend of the said siblings and was uncomfortable with Comaling's actions towards them. Comaling told Rustamov that he gave Raf 2 points as an act of vengeance since she had given him 2 points during the last two nominations, while he also questioned Nathan's religiousness, using it to "hide things".

Houseplayer Marky Miranda also received backlash online for having an intense confrontation with two of the housemates, Comaling and Zach Guerrero, with the latter celebrating his birthday inside the House while drinking whiskey. While drunk, Miranda talked to Guerrero about the Final Five and the tasks, the sacrifices they have made to stay in the house, the things that a housemate would expect after living inside the house, and that he doesn't deserve to be in the Final Five. The intense confrontation trended on Twitter, with the names of Guerrero, Miranda, and fellow housemate Isabel Laohoo topping the trend list along with the official hashtag of the episode. Miranda was criticized for his actions, while he also earned praise for his skills as a houseplayer, with users defining Miranda as the "perfect houseplayer" and "a houseplayer that will be never forgotten", as this was a part of their houseplayer task with Ja Nidoy; to show the authenticity of the housemates. Viewers also praised Guerrero for controlling himself during and after the confrontation. After the said confrontation, Comaling asked Miranda on why did he do that to his fellow housemate, as he was concerned about the friendship that he made while they are still in the house, even though he also talked behind his back about the Juane siblings. With Miranda acting enraged, he threw a pitcher on the sink, hitting Laohoo. To ease the confrontation, Big Brother then decided to separate the two to prevent them from fighting. The next day, Miranda and the housemates that were involved in the confrontation apologized for their actions against each other.

Stephanie Jordan called out Rob Blackburn for allegedly shouting at fellow housemate Kai Espenido as he was participating in K.E.A.'s punishment task, saying "Rob, next time you don't shout because di niya kasalanan 'to, ang sama ng ugali mo Rob!" ("Rob, next time you don't shout because it's not her fault, your attitude is bad Rob!") after Blackburn said "You should be!" to Espenido in an aggravated tone which caused the latter to cry. Jordan reiterated the events outside to Gabb Skribikin and Stef Draper, who were working on their weekly task inside. Jordan went back outside for a while, but quickly went inside again after Skribikin and Maxine Trinidad calmed her down, and Tiff Ronato restrained her from going outside in order for Blackburn to not feel any more pressure. Espenido was still crying when she came back, and Draper said that "it was the third time he (Blackburn) shouted to girls", in which Jordan responded "Di yan pwede guys, di yan pwede! Kahit anong gagawin mo, hindi ka pwede sumigaw sa tao na walang dahilan! Di tayo pwede maging soft sa lalaki na walang utak na ginagamit!" ("That's not allowed guys, that's not allowed! Whatever you do, you can't shout at someone without a reason! We can't be soft to boys that don't use their brains!"), which earned a mixed reaction from viewers. Some praised her for being frank and unfiltered, while others criticized her for the words she used and for being insensitive towards Blackburn, who had told Draper and Trinidad in an earlier episode about trauma he had from being a victim of bullying by his classmates. Blackburn apologized to Espenido the day after the incident.

Gabb Skribikin and Kai Espenido were widely criticized across social media platforms for incorrectly answering a question about the collective nickname of three Filipino priests executed during the Spanish colonial period, namely Mariano Gomez, Jose Burgos, and Jacinto Zamora, known as Gomburza, during their History Quiz Bee. Espenido answered "MarJo", while Skribikin answered "MaJoHa". The latter was also criticized for answering "SLEX" to a question about the San Juanico Bridge. Viewers said that the incorrect answers of both Espenido and Skribikin are a symptom of the Philippines' poor education system, and others called for the Department of Education (DepEd) to "open the schools" online.

Host Robi Domingo, who asked the history questions to the housemates, expressed his disappointment on Twitter a few days after the history quiz bee trended across social media, saying "Sa una, nakakatawa pero habang tumatagal, di na nakakatuwa. Sana maging daan ito para makita kung ano ang kakulangan sa sistema ng ating edukasyon. Sa lahat ng content creators, let's battle #MaJoHa." ("At first, it's funny but as time passes by, it's not amusing anymore. I hope this will be a way to shed light on the gaps in our education system. To all content creators, let's battle #MaJoHa.")

The show came under fire once again, this time, at the end of the season, for posting a now-deleted teaser of the Big Homecoming that contains a teaser of a spoof of celebrity ex-housemates KD Estrada and Anji Salvacion's confrontation during the Celebrity Edition, where Salvacion told Estrada that "there will never be a chance (of them being together as a loveteam or a couple)", on its social media pages last June 4. The spoof was done by Teen Edition Plus runner-up and host Robi Domingo and Lucky 7 winner Maymay Entrata portraying Estrada and Salvacion respectively. As a result, the sentences "DEPRESSION IS NOT A JOKE" and "STOP USING KD FOR CLOUT" trended almost immediately on Twitter and Estrada deactivated his Twitter account after the said video went viral across Facebook and Twitter.

Former Otso ex-housemate Wakim Regalado, who also suffers from depression, stated on Twitter that he "rebukes Pinoy'' Big Brother's insensitive and irresponsible move to trivialize and make fun of Estrada's experience." Fans of Estrada and loveteam partner Alexa Ilacad, as well as fans of the seasons' celebrity, adult, and teen housemates, and the shows' viewers, expressed their support on this matter.

There has yet to be an official word from the show's producers or hosts on the occurrence of the incident.

References

External links
Pinoy Big Brother official website

Pinoy Big Brother
Rating controversies in television
Television controversies in the Philippines
Criticism of television series
2000s controversies
2010s controversies
2020s controversies